Hung Cheng (born March 2, 1937), also known as Hong Zheng, is an American professor of applied mathematics at MIT.

Education 

Cheng received his B.Sc and the Ph.D. degrees from the California Institute of Technology, in 1959 and 1961. He had post-doctorate research appointments at Caltech, Princeton University and Harvard University before joining the MIT faculty in applied mathematics in 1965. His doctoral advisor was Leverett Davis, Jr., and his thesis was on spin absorption lines of solids.

Career 

In 1978, he was elected Academician of Taiwan's Academia Sinica. He has also served as the Chairman of the Applied Mathematics Committee at the MIT Department of Mathematics, and is on the Editorial Board of the Journal Studies in Applied Mathematics. His recent research interests have been directed to the mathematical physics of dark matter and dark energy. In 2017, Cheng received the Distinguished Achievement Award in Technology and Humanity/Humanities from the Chinese Institute of Engineers.

In 2016, Cheng published his first novel, Nanjing Never Cries.

Personal life 

Cheng lives in Brookline, Massachusetts.

External links
 Academia Sinica Directory
 MIT Department of Mathematics listing
 Editorial Board of Applied Mathematics Journal
 Physical Review Journals Archive

1937 births
Living people
20th-century American mathematicians
Massachusetts Institute of Technology School of Science faculty
California Institute of Technology alumni
Princeton University people
Harvard University staff
American people of Taiwanese descent
21st-century American physicists
21st-century American mathematicians